Lucama Municipal Historic District is a national historic district located at Lucama, Wilson County, North Carolina.  It encompasses 42 contributing buildings in the railroad town of Lucama.  The district developed between about 1890 to 1930 and includes notable examples of Classical Revival, Bungalow / American Craftsman, and Victorian style architecture. Notable buildings include the Will Davis Store (c. 1890), Jesse Lucas Store (c. 1890), Lucama Depot (1905), Kinchen Barnes Store (c. 1900), W. J. Newsome Store (c. 1900), Lousetta Newsome House (1887), Dr. Ben Hackney House, and Lucama Methodist Church (1915).

It was listed on the National Register of Historic Places in 1986.

References

Historic districts on the National Register of Historic Places in North Carolina
Neoclassical architecture in North Carolina
Victorian architecture in North Carolina
Geography of Wilson County, North Carolina
National Register of Historic Places in Wilson County, North Carolina